Branded and Exiled is the second studio album by German heavy metal band Running Wild, released in 1985.

Track listing 
All music and lyrics written by Rolf Kasparek except where noted

Note 
 Some CD versions feature a different version of "Chains and Leather" with notably different vocals

Personnel 
Rolf Kasparek – guitar, vocals
Michael Kupper – guitars, backing vocals
Stephan Boriss – bass, backing vocals
Wolfgang Hagemann – drums, backing vocals

Production
Horst Müller – co-producer, recording, mixing
Karl-U. Walterbach – executive producer
Thomas Stiegler – mixing
Running Wild – artwork
D. Magnussen – photography
Thotsten Hanl – management

References 

1985 albums
Running Wild (band) albums
Noise Records albums